The Ugly Duckling and Me! is a 2006 animated film directed by Michael Hegner and Karsten Kiilerich. Intended for a family audience, it is a modern adaptation of the 1843 fairy tale "The Ugly Duckling" by Hans Christian Andersen. The Yorkshire Post described it as a "feel good" film for family audiences. The film follows over a rat named Ratsco who has a dream about having his own family.  The life changes when an egg falls out of its nest revealing an ugly duckling with brushy wings, and he soon becomes a father.  It also won an award at the China International Cartoon and Digital Art Festival. The film initially premiered in Denmark on April 6, 2006.

Plot 
While working of a local army and finding a glass of ink, Professor Mukling the cat wins a nest full of eggs for a family of birds. A stork is assigned to deliver the nest, but due to his bumble antics, drops one egg after bumping into a nearby cliff. The egg rolls into a home full of chickens and is placed into a cage with the chicks.

Ten years later, A pampered cheese-loving rat named Ratsco has a hard time finding a home for a puppy Natasha, a struggling dog finding her talent. He runs into the humble stork who panics over the

References

External links 
 
 
 

2006 films
2006 animated films
M6 Films films
Danish animated films
English-language Danish films
English-language French films
English-language German films
English-language Irish films
British animated films
2000s French-language films
Films based on The Ugly Duckling
Animated films about rats
Films directed by Karsten Kiilerich
2000s British films